Cho Kwi-jae (born 16 January 1969) is a former South Korean football player and manager He is the current manager J1 League club of Kyoto Sanga.

Club statistics

Managerial statistics

Honours

As a coach 
 Shonan Bellmare
 J2 League (2): 2014, 2017
 J.League Cup (1): 2018

References

External links
 
 
 

1969 births
Living people
Waseda University alumni
Association football people from Kyoto Prefecture
South Korean footballers
South Korean expatriate footballers
Japan Soccer League players
J1 League players
Japan Football League (1992–1998) players
Kashiwa Reysol players
Urawa Red Diamonds players
Vissel Kobe players
J1 League managers
J2 League managers
Shonan Bellmare managers
Kyoto Sanga FC managers
South Korean expatriate sportspeople in Japan
Expatriate footballers in Japan
Association football defenders
South Korean football managers
South Korean expatriate football managers